Ricardo Mendieta (born on 19 January 1995) is a Nicaraguan professional football player who plays for Deportivo Las Sabanas and the Nicaragua national team.

He debuted internationally on 14 October 2019, scoring in the last minute of a 0–4 victory against Dominica, leading to Dominica's relegation to League C in the CONCACAF Nations League.

International goals
Scores and results list Nicaragua's goal tally first.

References

External links

1995 births
Living people
Nicaraguan men's footballers
Real Estelí F.C. players
Juventus Managua players
Nicaragua international footballers
Association football forwards